The cambroernids are an informally-named clade of unusual Paleozoic animals with coiled bodies and filamentous tentacles. They include a number of early to middle Paleozoic (Cambrian to Devonian) genera noted as 'bizarre" or "orphan" taxa, meaning that their affinities with other animals, living or extinct, has long been uncertain. One leading hypothesis is that cambroernids were unusual ambulacrarian deuterostomes, related to echinoderms and hemichordates. Previously some cambroernids were compared to members of the broad invertebrate clade Lophotrochozoa; in particularly they were allied with lophophorates, a subset of lophotrochozoans bearing ciliated tentacles known as lophophores. However, this interpretation has more recently been considered unlikely relative to the deuterostome hypothesis for cambroernid origins.

Cambroernids encompass three particular types of enigmatic animals first appearing in the Cambrian: Herpetogaster (the type genus), Phlogites, and the eldoniids. They are united by a set of common features including at least one pair of bifurcated or divided oral tentacles, and a large stomach and narrower intestine enclosed together in a coiled sac. Herpetogaster has a segmented and clockwise-curved body attached to the substrate via a narrow and partially mobile stolon (stalk). Phlogites was even more simple, with a thick immobile stolon leading up to a tentacle-bearing calyx (cup-shaped main body). The eldoniids (also known as eldonioids or eldonids) were diverse and disc-shaped, commonly described as "medusiform", i.e. jellyfish-shaped. Though the lifestyle of eldoniids is still debated, it can be agreed that they had a large curved stomach and no stolon.

References

Prehistoric deuterostomes
Burgess Shale fossils